Buffet froid is a 1979 French film written and directed by Bertrand Blier, starring Gérard Depardieu, Carole Bouquet, Bernard Blier and Jean Carmet. The film is a surreal black comedy portrayed as a crime thriller, set in Paris where contemporary urban life has alienated and dehumanized the city dwellers. The film won a César Award for Best Writing, and was nominated for Best Cinematography, Editing, and Production Design.

Plot
The film begins at La Défense station (RER), with Alphonse Tram (Gérard Depardieu), a less than gregarious character, idly chatting to an accountant who is travelling home very late. The accountant, a man of orthodox social outlook and standing is disturbed by and fearful of this rambling loner, more so when Tram attempts to give him his bloodstained knife (in order to reduce the chances of him "doing something silly...").  They argue and the accountant puts the knife on a seat a few feet away behind them. They argue some more and then notice the knife has disappeared.

Later that night, Tram discovers the same man in a tunnel leading from another metro station, lying down with the knife stabbed into his stomach. He has no explanation to the police inspector Bernard (Blier) he reports it to as to how it happened. He speculates, perhaps unwisely but without caring for the potential consequences (as in Camus' L'Étranger), to the police inspector that it was his own knife that killed the accountant. The police inspector, irate at having to consider a complex case while off-duty, pushes Tram out of his apartment saying he has a bellyfull of murders all day and doesn't want another to deal with. This sparks off a series of bizarre occurrences around the city as Tram's wife is killed, and the perpetrator (Jean Carmet) who confesses to the murder is seemingly taken light-heartedly by the police officer and Tram himself.

Cast
 Gérard Depardieu as Alphonse Tram
 Bernard Blier as Insp. Morvandiau
 Jean Carmet as The murderer
 Liliane Rovère as Josyane
 Carole Bouquet as The young woman at the end
 Jean Benguigui as The hired killer
 Jean Rougerie as Eugène Léonard
 Bernard Crombey as The doctor
 Eric Wasberg as Inspector Cavana
 Geneviève Page as Geneviève Léonard
 Michel Serrault as The accountant in the opening scenes (uncredited)

Reception
The film had 777,127 admissions in France which was considered average. It has however since gained cult status.

References

External links
 
 

1970s black comedy films
1979 films
1970s crime comedy films
French black comedy films
French crime comedy films
Films directed by Bertrand Blier
Films scored by Philippe Sarde
1970s French-language films
1970s crime thriller films
1979 comedy films
1970s French films